Bissen may refer to:

 Bissen, Luxembourg
 Bissen (Netherlands)
 Vilhelm Bissen, Danish sculptor
 Herman Wilhelm Bissen, Danish sculptor
 Georg Bissen, a trance artist and producer.